Maraschia is a genus of moths of the family Noctuidae.

Species
 Maraschia grisescens Osthelder, 1933

References
Natural History Museum Lepidoptera genus database
Maraschia at funet

Hadeninae